Alcatel ONE TOUCH Idol 3 4.7 and Idol 3 5.5 are Android smartphones manufactured by TCL Mobile and officially unveiled at 2015’s Mobile World Congress.
The Idol 3 lineup consists of two handsets that use the same design but differ in size and specifications. The Idol 3 4.7 features a 4.7” display while Idol 3 5.5 has a bigger 5.5” display. It's the first smartphones to come with a reversible design that allows the user to use the phone upside-down.

Specifications

Hardware 
Both models feature JBL certified stereo front-facing speakers, 13 megapixel rear camera, reversible design and displays tuned by Technicolor. The phone is available in Soft Gold, Metallic Silver and Dark Grey and in single-sim and dual-sim versions.

Idol 3 4.7 features a 4.7” display with a resolution of 1280 x 720 pixels (312 ppi). It has a Qualcomm Snapdragon 410 SoC clocked at 1.2 GHz alongside an Adreno 306 GPU and 1.5 GB of RAM. It is powered by a 2000 mAh non-removable Li-Ion battery and it is available in 8GB single-sim and 16GB dual-sim versions.

Idol 3 5.5 features a 5.5” display with a resolution of 1920 x 1080 pixels (401 ppi). It has a Qualcomm Snapdragon 615 SoC composed of a quad-core 1.5 GHz Cortex-A53 and a quad-core 1.0 GHz Cortex-A53 alongside an Adreno 405 GPU and 2 GB of RAM. It is powered by a 2910 mAh non-removable Li-Ion battery and it is available in 16 GB single-sim and 32 GB dual-sim versions.

Software 
The Idol 3 lineup comes with Android 5.0.2 Lollipop with customized icons and a few added features such as the option to use the phone upside-down and FM radio. The phone can be upgraded to Android Marshmallow 6.0.

References

Android (operating system) devices
Alcatel mobile phones
Mobile phones introduced in 2015